Dr. Surendra Gambhir is a United States based Indian author, writer and Adjunct Associate Professor, Department of South Asia Studies. He received Padmabhushan Dr. Moturi Satyanarayan Award in 2009 by Pratibha Devisingh Patil, President of India. He also received the Presidential Award in June 2012.

References

Year of birth missing (living people)
Living people
American male writers of Indian descent
University of Pennsylvania faculty